Cui Yingzi (born January 26, 1971) is a retired female race walker from PR China, who competed for her native country at the 1992 Summer Olympics in Barcelona, Spain. She set her personal best (42.47) in the women's 10 km event in 1992.

Achievements

References
Profile

1971 births
Living people
Chinese female racewalkers
Athletes (track and field) at the 1992 Summer Olympics
Olympic athletes of China